The 1901 LSU Tigers football team represented the LSU Tigers of Louisiana State University during the 1901 Southern Intercollegiate Athletic Association football season. Edmond Chavanne left the Tigers following the 1900 season and was replaced by W. S. Borland as head coach in 1901, leading the team to a successful 5–1 season. Tulane forfeited the game on November 16 due to a ruling from the SIAA.  The 1901 edition of the Battle for the Flag against LSU was originally a 22–0 victory for Tulane. It was later forfeited after a petition to the SIAA, and was recorded as a 0–11 loss for Tulane.  After the game, LSU protested to the Southern Intercollegiate Athletic Association, and alleged that Tulane had used a professional player during the game.  Several months later, the SIAA ruled the game an 11-0 forfeit in favor of LSU.

Schedule

Roster

Roster from Fanbase.com and LSU: The Louisiana Tigers

References

LSU
LSU Tigers football seasons
LSU Tigers football